is a 1977 Japanese film directed by Seijun Suzuki.

Plot
The film is about a professional model Reiko (Shiraki) who is being groomed for the golf circuit by the editor of a golfing fashion magazine.  During her first professional competition she has great success, winning the approval of her mentor, a TV audience and others. Suddenly, everyone wants a piece of Reiko. The plot turns sinister as one of her devoted followers develops an obsession with Reiko and starts to blackmail and threaten her.

Cast
 Yoko Shiraki
 Yoshio Harada
 Masumi Okada
 Joe Shishido
 Kōji Wada : Yoshizawa
 Shuji Sano
 Asao Koike
 Keisuke Noro

Reception
Jasper Sharp of Midnight Eye said, "Coming across like a deranged hybrid of Clint Eastwood's Play Misty for Me (1971) and Robert Aldrich's What Ever Happened to Baby Jane? (1962), this sinister social satire of Stepford Wives-esque suburban aspiration set against the glamorous world of big budget sports promotion is impossible to pigeonhole as anything other than a Suzuki film."

David Carter of Film Fanaddict described the film as "a vastly different film from his previous body of work, but one that retained many of the stylistic touches for which he was known and contained more than a few subtle digs at corporations, fame and the entertainment industry."

References

External links
 
 
 

1977 films
1970s thriller drama films
Films directed by Seijun Suzuki
Golf films
1970s Japanese-language films
Shochiku films
Japanese sports films
1977 drama films
1970s Japanese films